The 3rd Wildflower Film Awards is an awards ceremony recognizing the achievements of Korean independent and low-budget films. It was held at the Literature House in Seoul on April 7, 2016.

22 films were nominated across 10 categories, each with a budget under  and released theatrically between January 1 and December 31, 2015.

Best New Actor and Actress categories had been merged, with Best Supporting Performer being included.

Nominations and winners
(Winners denoted in bold)

References

External links 

Wildflower Film Awards
Wildflower Film Awards
Wildflower Film Awards